Route 215 is collector road in the Canadian province of Nova Scotia.

It is located in Hants County, connecting Shubenacadie at Trunk 2 with Newport Corner at Trunk 1.

Portions of the road are included in the Glooscap Trail and the Fundy Shore Ecotour.

A short portion of the road in the community of Brooklyn is duplexed with Trunk 14.

Geographic regions
The road passes through the following geographic regions:
 the Shubenacadie Valley
 the shore of the Bay of Fundy, specifically the southern shore of Cobequid Bay and the Minas Basin
 the lower portion of the Avon Valley as it follows the east bank of the Avon River

Communities
Communities in italics are served by the route indirectly.

Newport Corner
Brooklyn
Belmont
Upper Burlington
Centre Burlington
Cogmagun River
Riverside
Lower Burlington
Summerville
Kempt Shore
Cheverie
Bramber
Cambridge
Goshen
Pembroke
Walton
East Walton
Tenecape
Moose Brook
Minasville
Burntcoat
Noel
Lake Road
East Noel
Northfield
Densmore Mills
Noel Shore
Lower Selma
Stirling Brook
Selma
Maitland
South Maitland
Urbania
Admiral Rock
Rines Creek
Shubenacadie

Parks
Caddell Rapids Provincial Park
Anthony Provincial Park
Smiley’s Provincial Park

History

Highway 215 was formerly designated Trunk Highway 15.

See also
List of Nova Scotia provincial highways

References

Roads in Hants County, Nova Scotia
Nova Scotia provincial highways